Sardar Muhammad Ibrahim Khan (22 April 1915 – 31 July 2003) was the key instigator of the 1947 Poonch Rebellion in the princely state of Jammu and Kashmir in British India and the later establishment of Azad Kashmir under Pakistani administrative control. He served as the first President of Azad Kashmir. His dismissal in 1950 led to the 1955 Poonch Uprising against Pakistan. He served as the president thrice afterwards, ending his last term in 2001.

Early life and education
Sardar Muhammad Ibrahim Khan was born on 22 April 1915 in Kot Mattay Khan, a village in the Poonch District of Kashmir to an elite Sudhan family. He received his primary education in his village. He attended college and received a Bachelors of Arts degree in 1937 at Islamia College (Lahore) and sought higher education abroad in 1938. He obtained his LLB degree from the University of London in 1941. Khan then obtained a law degree from Lincoln's Inn, and later started practicing law at Srinagar, Kashmir.

1947 Poonch rebellion 
Ibrahim Khan played a pivotal role in the instigation of the 1947 Poonch rebellion and the First Kashmir War. In British India of 1946, he won the Jammu and Kashmir State Assembly election as a member of the Muslim Conference party and became a member of the Praja Sabha under Maharajah Hari Singh, Jammu and Kashmir ruler. This ruler signed a 'stand-still agreement' with Pakistan as a result of the Indian Independence Act 1947. In 1947, Ibrahim Khan instigated and organised the Poonch rebellion, and with Muslim League, planned and helped in the invasion and liberation of Jammu and Kashmir. Muslim Kashmiri leaders saw it as a liberation of Muslim-majority Kashmir from the Hindu ruler.

On 19 July 1947, Khan held a general assembly meeting at his residence where a resolution was unanimously passed for the State of Kashmir to join Pakistan. The Maharaja, Hari Singh, disapproved of his actions, and Khan left the state and went to Murree, Pakistan. In Murree, he gathered ammunition from private individuals and organizations. With several fellow Kashmiris, he launched a ‘Jihad’ against the Maharaja. On 24 October 1947, he defeated the forces of the Maharaja in the Poonch rebellion and founded the state of Azad Kashmir, which became a self-governing division of Pakistan.

After fighting the Indian Army for 15 months, the Azad Kashmir militia accepted a United Nations-mediated ceasefire. Khan and his army were able to capture substantial portions of the three western districts of Kashmir, which were renamed Azad Kashmir (Free Kashmir).

Khan was appointed the first President of tiny Azad Kashmir in 1948 by Pakistan. He represented Kashmir in different capacities at the United Nations from 1948 to 1971.

Sardar Muhammad Ibrahim Khan also wrote a book named The Kashmir Saga on government and politics of Azad Kashmir and included the history and philosophy of freedom struggle in the book.

1955 Poonch uprising 

Khan's dismissal is widely regarded as the trigger to the 1955 uprising in Poonch Division.

Professional and political career
Under the Maharajah's rule in 1943, Khan was appointed as a public prosecutor in Mirpur. He later worked at the State Advocate General office of Jammu and Kashmir. Then he left the government job to participate in the Kashmir Freedom Movement, and ran for and won the 1946 Jammu and Kashmir State Assembly elections. He went on to serve three more terms in office until August 2001, when he had to leave due to old age. He retired at the age of 86. He also established the organization called Azad Muslim Conference.

President of Azad Kashmir
As the first self-proclaimed President of Azad Kashmir, he was invited by the United Nations to brief the General assembly on the situation in Kashmir. Under the leadership of Khan, the annual session of the All Jammu and Kashmir Muslim Conference was held at Kotli in 1954, and a resolution was passed for the establishment of a proper Legislative Assembly in Azad Kashmir. While he and his lieutenants continued to push for a legislative assembly, it wouldn't be until the presidency of General Yahya Khan in 1969 that the Azad Kashmir Legislative Assembly would be formed. Khan was elected president of Azad Kashmir for the second time on 13 April 1957, and for the third time on 5 June 1975. Sardar Ibrahim was very close to Zulfiqar Ali Bhutto and had formed the Azad Kashmir chapter of the Pakistan Peoples Party. In 1977, General Zia ul-Haq dissolved Bhutto's government, and offered to allow Khan to continue as president as long as he stopped supporting Bhutto. Khan refused to betray Bhutto, resulting in his termination as president through a proclamation issued by General Zia Ul-Haq, the Chairman of Azad Jammu and Kashmir Council, on 30 October 1978. Khan, however, was elected again as the President of Azad Kashmir in August 1996. He remained in office until August 2001 and was the Azad Kashmir president four times in his lifetime.

Death and legacy
Sardar Muhammad Ibrahim Khan died at his Islamabad, Pakistan home on 31 July 2003 after a long illness at age 88. President Pervez Musharraf and Prime Minister Zafarullah Khan Jamali paid tributes to him in their condolence messages.

Due to his services to Kashmir freedom struggle, he is known among the people of Kashmir as:
 Bani-e-Kashmir ("Founder of Azad Kashmir")
 Ghazi-e-Millat ("Hero of the Nation")

References

Further reading
 
 

1915 births
2003 deaths
Kashmiri people
People of the 1947 Kashmir conflict
Alumni of the University of London
Members of Lincoln's Inn
Pakistan Movement activists from Kashmir
People from Poonch District, Pakistan
Presidents of Azad Kashmir
People of the Indo-Pakistani War of 1947
Government Islamia College alumni